Sion Elgan Morris (born 6 September 1977) is a Welsh cricketer. Morris is a left-handed batsman. He was born in St Asaph, Denbighshire.

Morris made his Minor Counties Championship debut for Wales Minor Counties in 1998 against Cornwall. From 1998 to 2003, he represented the team in 12 Championship matches, the last of which came against Oxfordshire. His MCCA Knockout Trophy debut for the team came in 2001 against the Worcestershire Cricket Board. From 2001 to 2004, he represented the team in four Trophy matches, the last of which again came against Oxfordshire. His debut List A appearance for the team came in the third round of the 2002 Cheltenham & Gloucester Trophy against Durham. From 2002 to 2004, he represented the team in four List A matches, the last of which came against Middlesex. In his four matches, he scored 56 runs at a batting average of 18.66, with a high score of 46.

He currently plays club cricket for Colwyn Bay Cricket Club in the Liverpool and District Cricket Competition.

References

External links
Sion Morris at Cricinfo
Sion Morris at CricketArchive

1977 births
Living people
Sportspeople from St Asaph
Welsh cricketers
Wales National County cricketers